(stylised as "andymori") was a Japanese indie rock band, signed to Youth Records. They debuted in 2008 with the EP Andy to Rock to Bengal Tora to Whisky. The band's name came from merging Andy Warhol and the phrase memento mori.

Biography 

Andymori first formed in 2007, performing live at live houses in the Tokyo area. Their first big event was the Fuji Rock Festival in 2008, where they performed on the new artist stage. The band released their first EP "Andy to Rock to Bengal Tora to Whisky" in October 2008, as the first new artist signed to Youth Records. This was followed by their full-length album in February 2009, Andymori. The lead single, "Follow Me," was chosen as an iTunes Single of the Week free download song in January.

The band performed at many of the major summer festivals in 2009, such as Rock in Japan and Summer Sonic. In October, the band held their first one-man live, and featured on the 10 year anniversary tribute album for Quruli.

In 2010, the band released their second album, Fanfare to Nekkyō. Prior to its release, they were picked as one of the iTunes Japan "Sound of 2010" break-through artists, and their video for "Follow Me" was nominated for the Best New Artist award for the 2010 Space Shower Music Video Awards. The album has so far reached No. 9 on the Oricon albums daily charts.

The band performed overseas for the first time in 2010, with four concerts across Canada in May 2010 at the first Next Music from Tokyo!!! concert event.

Hiroki Gotō performed his last live show with the band on November 27, at Club Seata in Kichijôji. Sôhei Oyamada said in a radio show held in Ôsaka (MUSIC FREAKS FM802) that Hiroki asked for "Life Is Party" to be on the setlist for the show because it is his favorite song. The new drummer was announced to be Okayama Kenji (岡山健二), with his first live show held on December 2, 2010 at Shimokitazawa Shelter.

In 2014, it was announced that Andymori would break up after seven years. The band released its final album, Uchū no Hate wa Kono Me no Mae ni , on June 26 of that year, and perform a tour from July until September. The final date of the tour was held at the Nippon Budokan on September 24.

Discography

Albums

Extended plays

Singles

DVDs 
 (2010)
 (2012)

References

External links 
 Andymori Official Site 
 

Japanese alternative rock groups
Musical groups established in 2007
Musical groups from Tokyo